Fencote or Great Fencote is a village in the Hambleton District of North Yorkshire, England. It has a smaller village nearby called Little Fencote. Kirkby Fleetham lies to the north.

References

Villages in North Yorkshire